Sang-e Sefid or Sang Sefid or Sang-i-Sefid or Sangsefid or Sang-e Safid or Sang-i-Safid may refer to:

Fars Province
 Sang-e Sefid, Abadeh Tashk, a village in Neyriz County
 Sang-e Sefid, Qatruyeh, a village in Neyriz County

Hamadan Province
 Sang-e Sefid, Bahar, a village in Bahar County
 Sang-e Sefid-e Nanaj, a village in Malayer County
 Sang-e Sefid, Tuyserkan, a village in Tuyserkan County
 Sang-e Sefid, Qolqol Rud, a village in Tuyserkan County

Ilam Province
 Sang-e Sefid, Ilam, a village in Shirvan and Charadaval County

Isfahan Province
 Sang-e Sefid, Isfahan, a village in Khvansar County

Kermanshah Province
 Sang-e Sefid, Kermanshah, a village in Kermanshah County
 Sang-e Sefid, Sahneh, a village in Sahneh County

Kurdistan Province
 Sang-e Sefid, Kamyaran, a village in Kamyaran County
 Sang Sefid, Hoseynabad-e Jonubi, a village in Sanandaj County
 Sang-e Sefid, Naran, a village in Sanandaj County

Lorestan Province
 Sang-e Sefid, Borborud-e Gharbi, a village in Aligudarz County
 Sang-e Sefid, Borborud-e Sharqi, a village in Aligudarz County
 Sang-e Sefid, Borujerd, a village in Borujerd County

Markazi Province
 Sang-e Sefid, Markazi, a village in Shazand County
 Sang Sefid Rural District, in Khondab County

Razavi Khorasan Province
 Sefid Sang, a city in Razavi Khosrasan Province
 Sang-e Sefid, Chenaran, a village in Chenaran County
 Sang-e Sefid, Sabzevar, a village in Sabzevar County